Marianne Franken (11 March 1884 – 4 April 1945) was a Dutch painter.

Biography
Franken was born on 11 March 1884 in Amsterdam. She studied at the Internationaal schildersatelier (Amsterdam) (International painting studio). She also exhibited with the Amsterdamse Joffers. Her subjects included still lifes, portraits (particularly of children), and genre scenes from her Jewish neighborhood near the Prinseneiland river in Amsterdam.

Her work was included in the 1939 exhibition and sale Onze Kunst van Heden (Our Art of Today) at the Rijksmuseum in Amsterdam.

Franken died on 4 April 1945 in the Bergen-Belsen concentration camp, Germany.

References

External links

images of Franken's work on ArtNet

1884 births
1945 deaths
Dutch people who died in Bergen-Belsen concentration camp
Artists from Amsterdam
20th-century Dutch women artists
Dutch Jews who died in the Holocaust